Vicky Luengo (born 7 April 1990) is a Spanish film, television and stage actress.

Biography 
She was born on 7 April 1990 in Palma de Mallorca, but after fours years she moved with her mother and brother to Barcelona, where she was raised. She took an interest in acting at a young age, and she got her first role in a stage play at barely 14 years old. She studied acting, dance and singing at the Barcelona's Memory School.  Her debut in television was an appearance as background actress in Rumors (2006), later obtaining larger roles in the TV series Hospital Central and La pecera de Eva. In 2013, she joined the theatrical cast of Una historia catalana, a play represented at the National Theatre of Catalonia.

Her breakout performance was her role in the TV series Riot Police, aired in 2020 on Movistar+. She plays Laia Urquijo, an Internal Affairs police officer who must investigate the potential misbehaviour committed by a squad of riot police officers during an eviction.

Filmography 

Television

Film

Accolades

References 

1990 births
21st-century Spanish actresses
Spanish film actresses
Spanish television actresses
Spanish stage actresses
People from Palma de Mallorca
Actresses from Barcelona
Living people